The 1985 Deutsche Produktionswagen Meisterschaft was the second season of premier German touring car championship and also last season before the championship was renamed to the Deutsche Tourenwagen Meisterschaft.

The championship was run under modified Group A regulations, which was won by Per Stureson driving a Volvo 240 Turbo.

References

Deutsche Tourenwagen Masters seasons
1985 in German motorsport